"You and You Alone" is a song written and recorded by American country music artist Vince Gill.  It was released in July 1997 as the fifth single from the album High Lonesome Sound.  The song reached number 8 on the Billboard Hot Country Singles & Tracks chart.  The song features singer-songwriter Shelby Lynne on backing vocals during the chorus, and both performers appeared on the 1997 CMA Awards show performing the song together.

Critical reception
Deborah Evans Price, of Billboard magazine reviewed the song favorably, calling the song "smooth, warm, and swirling with gentle emotion." She goes on to say that the production is "typically classy and understated."

Music video
The music video was directed by Gerry Wenner and premiered in mid-1997.

Chart performance
"You and You Alone" debuted at number 54 on the U.S. Billboard Hot Country Singles & Tracks for the week of July 19, 1997.

Year-end charts

References

1997 singles
Vince Gill songs
Songs written by Vince Gill
Song recordings produced by Tony Brown (record producer)
MCA Records singles
1996 songs